Bacons is an unincorporated community located four miles north of the Maryland state line in Sussex County, Delaware, United States. Also known as Bacon Switch, the site was once a thriving railroad switch point in the late 19th century. The site between Delmar and Laurel, Delaware had a number of small stores. It was named after the Bacon family, who started a farm there, before expanding into the sawmill and basket making business.  Parents Thomas and Amelia Bacon, had five sons: Frank, Albert, Thomas, William and Harry. The son Thomas designed a collapsible egg carrier in 1884 that was granted a US Patent, number 299715 .  The egg carrier was used to ship eggs to Philadelphia, where it would be collapsed and returned to the farmer.  Thomas Bacon Jr. died in 1939.

References

Unincorporated communities in Sussex County, Delaware
Unincorporated communities in Delaware